Moct is an unincorporated community in Breathitt County, Kentucky, United States.

References

Unincorporated communities in Breathitt County, Kentucky
Unincorporated communities in Kentucky